The 2011 Hamburg state election was held on 20 February 2011 to elect the members of the 20th Hamburg Parliament. The election was triggered by the collapse of the coalition government between the Christian Democratic Union (CDU) and the Green Alternative List (GAL), which had governed the state since 2008. The election was a landslide defeat for the CDU, which lost half its voteshare and seats. The margin of defeat for the incumbent Ahlhaus Senate is the largest in post-war German history and has not been met since. Much of this lost support flowed to the Social Democratic Party (SPD), which won 62 of the 121 seats in Parliament, forming a majority government led by Olaf Scholz.

Background
After the 2008 state election, the CDU formed a coalition government with the GAL. This was the first time such a government had been formed in Germany, as the Greens were seen as aligned with the SPD, typically in opposition to the CDU. Popular CDU mayor Ole von Beust was seen as a stabilising force for the government. After his retirement in August 2010 and the election of Christoph Ahlhaus as his successor, relations between the two parties became increasingly strained. In November 2010, GAL left the government. Ahlhaus formed a minority CDU Senate and the Parliament subsequently voted to dissolve itself and hold early elections.

Parties
The table below lists parties represented in the 19th Hamburg Parliament.

Opinion polling

Election result

|-
! colspan="2" | Party
! Votes
! %
! +/-
! Seats 
! +/-
! Seats %
|-
| bgcolor=| 
| align=left | Social Democratic Party (SPD)
| align=right| 1,667,804
| align=right| 48.4
| align=right| 14.3
| align=right| 62
| align=right| 17
| align=right| 51.2
|-
| bgcolor=| 
| align=left | Christian Democratic Union (CDU)
| align=right| 753,805
| align=right| 21.9
| align=right| 20.7
| align=right| 28
| align=right| 28
| align=right| 23.1
|-
| bgcolor=| 
| align=left | Green Alternative List (GAL)
| align=right| 384,502
| align=right| 11.2
| align=right| 1.6
| align=right| 14
| align=right| 2
| align=right| 11.6
|-
| bgcolor=| 
| align=left | Free Democratic Party (FDP)
| align=right| 229,125
| align=right| 6.7
| align=right| 1.9
| align=right| 9
| align=right| 9
| align=right| 7.4
|-
| bgcolor=| 
| align=left | The Left (Linke)
| align=right| 220,428
| align=right| 6.4
| align=right| 0.0
| align=right| 8
| align=right| 0
| align=right| 6.6
|-
! colspan=8|
|-
| bgcolor=| 
| align=left | Pirate Party Germany (Piraten)
| align=right| 73,126
| align=right| 2.1
| align=right| 1.9
| align=right| 0
| align=right| ±0
| align=right| 0
|-
| bgcolor=|
| align=left | Others
| align=right| 115,812
| align=right| 3.4
| align=right| 
| align=right| 0
| align=right| ±0
| align=right| 0
|-
! align=right colspan=2| Total
! align=right| 3,444,602
! align=right| 100.0
! align=right| 
! align=right| 121
! align=right| ±0
! align=right| 
|-
! align=right colspan=2| Voter turnout
! align=right| 
! align=right| 57.3
! align=right| 6.2
! align=right| 
! align=right| 
! align=right| 
|}

See also
 Elections in Hamburg
 Hamburg state elections in the Weimar Republic

References

2011 elections in Germany
2011 state election
2011
February 2011 events in Germany
Olaf Scholz